David C. Williams was the vice chairman of the Board of Governors of the United States Postal Service from September 13, 2018, to April 30, 2020, and served as  Inspector General (IG) for the U.S. Postal Service, in the United States Postal Service Office of Inspector General, from 2003 to 2016.

Career
Following a tour of military duty in Vietnam; Williams joined the United States Secret Service, and was assigned to President Ronald Reagan Commission on Organized Crime, then led the Office of Special Investigations at the General Accounting Office (since renamed the Government Accountability Office), prior to his confirmation as Inspector General for various federal agencies, including the Social Security Administration, Department of the Treasury, Internal Revenue Service, Nuclear Regulatory Commission, and Department of Housing and Urban Development, as well as vice chair of the Government Accountability and Transparency Board.

After Securities and Exchange Commission (SEC) Assistant Inspector General David P. Weber alleged improper conduct by SEC Inspector General David Kotz in the investigation of the Bernie Madoff Ponzi scheme, Williams was brought in to conduct an independent, outside review of Kotz's alleged improper conduct in 2012. The Williams Report questioned Kotz's work on the Madoff investigation, because Kotz was a "very good friend" with Markopolos. Although investigators were not able to determine when Kotz and Markopolos became friends, the Report concluded that it would have violated U.S. ethics rules if their relationship began before or during Kotz's investigation of Madoff.

In June 2013, Williams criticized the Postal Service's real estate contract with CBRE, a multinational real estate company, citing "conflict of interest concerns."

References

External links

1947 births
Living people
Military personnel from Indiana
People from Illinois
People from Granite City, Illinois
Southern Illinois University Edwardsville alumni
United States Inspectors General by name
United States Postal Service people
United States Secret Service agents
University of Illinois alumni